David Widgery (27 April 1947 – 26 October 1992) was a British Marxist writer, journalist, polemicist, physician, and activist.

Biography
Widgery was born in Barnet and grew up in Maidenhead, Berkshire. He contracted polio as a child and was expelled from sixth form for publishing a magazine.

In 1965, Widgery met Allen Ginsberg, then visited Watts, where he encountered the civil rights movement, followed by Cuba. On return to Britain, he studied medicine at the Royal Free Hospital Medical School before writing for the New Statesman and Oz magazines, becoming co-editor of Oz during 1971.

Widgery joined the International Socialists in 1967, remaining in the group when it became the Socialist Workers Party in 1977. He  began working at Bethnal Green Hospital in 1972, worked at St Leonard’s Hospital in the late 1970s and later in the decade he published his first book, The Left in Britain, 1956–68.

Widgery contributed to Ink, Time Out and City Limits, also writing for the New Statesman, Socialist Review, International Socialism and New Society.

He also presented a paper at the ninth symposium of the National Deviancy Conference in Sheffield (7–8 January 1972) on "The Politics of the Underground".

His books include The Chatto Book of Dissent (1991), an anthology of dissident writings co-edited with Michael Rosen, Some Lives!: A GP's East End (1991), the story of his experience as a doctor in London's East End, The National Health: A Radical Perspective, and Beating Time (1986), an account of the Rock Against Racism movement of the late 1970s.

When Widgery died, aged 45, excess alcohol, barbiturates and pethidine were found in his bloodstream, but it is not known whether this was an accidental or intentional overdose. One obituary described Widgery as "a radical humanist intellectual on permanent loan to revolutionary socialism."

Publications
 Widgery, D. (1976), The Left in Britain, 1956-68 (Peregrine Books)
 Widgery, D. (ed) (1980), The Book of the Year: September 1979 to September 1980 (Inklinks)
 Widgery, D., The National Health: A Radical Perspective
 Widgery, D. (1986), Beating Time
 Widgery, D. (1989), Preserving Disorder (Essays on Society & Culture) (Pluto Press) 
 Widgery, D. and Rosen, M. (eds) (1991), The Chatto Book of Dissent (Chatto)
 Widgery, D. and Shelton, S. (1991), Some Lives!: A GP's East End, London: Sinclair Stevenson.
 Widgery, D. (1991), Marketa Luskacova: Photographs of Spitalfields (Whitechapel Art Gallery)

References

External links
 Catalogue of Widgery's papers, held at the Modern Records Centre, University of Warwick
 
 
 
 

  
 
 
 

1947 births
1992 deaths
British anti-racism activists
British communists
British humanists
British male journalists
British Marxists
20th-century English medical doctors
British socialists
British Trotskyists
Drug-related deaths in England
Barbiturates-related deaths
Male non-fiction writers
Marxist journalists
Marxist writers
People from Chipping Barnet
People from Maidenhead
People with polio
Socialist Workers Party (UK) members